Richard Arthur Newbill (born February 8, 1968) is a former American football linebacker who played three seasons in the National Football League with the Minnesota Vikings and Seattle Seahawks. He was drafted by the Houston Oilers in the fifth round of the 1990 NFL Draft. He first enrolled at Bakersfield College before transferring to the University of Miami. Newbill attended Clearview Regional High School in Mullica Hill, New Jersey. He was also a member of the London/English Monarchs.

References

External links
Just Sports Stats

Living people
1968 births
Players of American football from Camden, New Jersey
American football linebackers
African-American players of American football
Bakersfield Renegades football players
Miami Hurricanes football players
Minnesota Vikings players
Seattle Seahawks players
London Monarchs players
21st-century African-American people
20th-century African-American sportspeople